B.F. Day Elementary School is an elementary school located in the Fremont neighborhood of Seattle, Washington, United States, part of the Seattle Public Schools school district.

It was originally designed by John Parkinson during 1891 and 1892.

References

Day
Day
Day
Fremont, Seattle